Unna Guovdelisjávri or Vuolip Čoarvejávri is a lake that is located on the border of Norway and Sweden. The Norwegian side lies in Narvik Municipality in Nordland county and the Swedish side lies in Kiruna Municipality in Norrbotten County. The ending -jávri is the word for "lake" in the Northern Sami language.

See also
List of lakes in Norway

References

Narvik
Lakes of Nordland
Lakes of Norrbotten County
Norway–Sweden border
International lakes of Europe